This is a list of the Malayan federal electoral districts used between 1955 and 1959. During this period, the Federal Legislative Council had 52 seats. This arrangement was only used in the 1955 Malayan general election.

Perlis

Kedah

Kelantan

Trengganu

Penang-Province Wellesley

Perak

Pahang

Selangor

Negri Sembilan

Malacca

Johore

References

Elections in Malaysia
Lists of constituencies
 
Malaysia politics-related lists